This is a list of women writers who were born in Romania or whose writings are closely associated with that country.

A
Gabriela Adameșteanu (born 1942), novelist, short story writer, essayist, journalist, translator
Florența Albu (1934–2000), poet

B
Elena Bacaloglu (1878–1947), journalist, critic, novelist, fascist militant
Maria Baciu (born 1942), poet, novelist, children's writer, critic
Maria Baiulescu (1860–1941), writer, women's rights activist
Zsófia Balla (born 1949) prominent Romanian-born Hungarian poet, essayist
Carmen-Francesca Banciu (born 1955), novelist
Linda Maria Baros (born 1981), Romanian-born highly acclaimed French-language poet, translator, critic
Marthe Bibesco (1886–1973), novelist, short story writer, essayist, writing in French
Adriana Bittel (born 1946), poet, critic
Ana Blandiana (born 1942), poet, essayist, political figure
Calypso Botez (1880–1933), writer, women's rights activist
Rodica Bretin (born 1958), fantasy novelist, non-fiction historical works, translator

C
Nina Cassian (1924–2014), poet, translator, journalist, critic
Otilia Cazimir (1884–1967), poet, novelist, children's writer, translator
Ruxandra Cesereanu (born 1963), poet, essayist, short story writer, novelist, critic
Sofia Cocea (1839–1861), Moldavian-born essayist, journalist, poet
Mariana Codruț (born 1956), poet, novelist, journalist
Lena Constante (1909–2005), artist, essayist, known for her autobiography written in French
Ioana Crăciunescu (born 1950), poet, actress
Gabriella Csire (born 1938), Hungarian-Romanian children's writer, columnist, editor

D
Cella Delavrancea (1887–1991), pianist, essayist, short story writer, novelist
Elena Djionat (1888–fl.1936), educator, journalist, women's rights activist
Bucura Dumbravă (1868–1926), Hungarian-born Romanian genre novelist, writing mainly in German
Zoe Dumitrescu-Bușulenga (1920–2006), magazine publisher, non-fiction author, essayist

E
Elisabeth of Wied (1843–1916), Queen Consort of Romania, poet, novelist, essayist, writing in German, Romanian, French and English under the pen name Carmen Sylvia

F
Elena Farago (1878–1954), poet, children's writer
Carmen Firan (born 1958), poet, novelist, short story writer, journalist, playwright, writing in Romanian and English
Mária Földes (1925–1976), Romanian-Hungarian playwright, writing in Hungarian

G
Anneli Ute Gabanyi (born 1942), Romanian-born German-language political scientist, critic, journalist, philologist
 Anca Giurchescu (1930–2015), Romanian-Danish folk dance researcher and academic
Delia Grigore (born 1972), Romani-language non-fiction writer, philologist, Romani rights activist

H
Iulia Hasdeu (1869–1888), poet, essayist, writing in French, died from tuberculosis when only 18

I
Dora d'Istria, pen name of Duchess Helena Koltsova-Massalskaya (1828–1888), narrative writer, essayist, feminist, writing mainly in French
Nora Iuga (born 1931), poet, writer and translator

L
Monica Lovinescu (1923–2008), essayist, short story writer, critic, translator, journalist

M
Veronica Micle (1850–1889), Austrian-born Romanian poet
Mărgărita Miller-Verghy (1865–1953), short story writer, journalist, novelist, critic, translator
Claudia Moscovici (born 1969), Romanian-born American novelist
Herta Müller (born 1953), Romanian-born German-language novelist, poet, essayist, Nobel prizewinner 
Alina Mungiu-Pippidi (born 1964), political scientist, journalist, essayist, playwright

N
Sofia Nădejde (1856–1946), journalist, non-fiction writer, women's rights activist
Cristina Nemerovschi (born 1980), novelist, non-fiction writer
Tatiana Niculescu Bran, non-fiction novelist, known for Deadly Confession (2006) which led to the film Beyond the Hills
Anna de Noailles (1876–1933), French-language novelist, autobiographer, poet

P
Hortensia Papadat-Bengescu (1876–1955), novelist
Dora Pavel (born 1946), novelist, short story writer, poet, journalist
Laura Pavel (born 1968), essayist, critic, translator
Marta Petreu (born 1955), philosopher, critic, essayist, poet
Elena Pop-Hossu-Longin (1856–1946), journalist, women's rights activist

R
Doina Ruști (born 1959), novelist, symbologist

S
Izabela Sadoveanu-Evan (1870–1941), literary critic, journalist, poet, feminist
Lucreția Suciu-Rudow (1859–1900), poet
Cella Serghi (1907–1992), novelist

V
Elena Văcărescu (1864–1947), poet, novelist, memoirist, playwright, writing mainly in French

See also
List of women writers

References

-
Romanian
Writers
Writers, women